Serge Marsolan is a former French rugby league international after debuting in rugby union.

Career
He practiced rugby union in Lombez since 12 years, then at the club born from the merger of the Lombez and Samatan clubs. Later, he joined Auch at the age of 22 for three seasons before switching codes to rugby league following a disagreement with the Auch club.

His arrival in rugby league at Saint-Gaudens was successful as he formed with Michel Molinier one of the most performant winger combinations. The two teammates are regularly selected for the France national team. Marsolan notably took part at the 1970 and 1972 World Cups. At Saint-Gaudens, he takes part to five French Championship finals in 1969, 1970 (won), 1971, 1973 et 1974 (won), and won as well the Lord Derby Cup in 1972.

References

External links 
 Serge Marsolan profile at rugbyleagueproject.com

1945 births
Living people
France national rugby league team players
French rugby league players
Rugby league centres
Rugby league wingers
Rugby union centres
Rugby union wings
Saint-Gaudens Bears players
Sportspeople from Gers
French rugby union players